The House of Poschinger is an ancient Bavarian noble family. It traces its origins back to 1140. The family received the rank of Knights of the Holy Roman Empire. The Frauenau branch rose to the rank of Barons (Freiherr) in the Kingdom of Bavaria and held a hereditary seat in the House of Councillors.

History 
The first documented branch of the House of Poschinger worked as ministeriales for the Prince-Bishops of Passau. Records of the family begin with Rapoto de Paskengen mentioned in 1140 as a witness of a donation to the Augustinian monastery of Aldersbach. Further branches existed in Posching (in the areas around Mitterfels, Metten, Deggendorf and later also in Pförring near Ingolstadt), in the estate of Sicklasberg near Konzell and as councillors in Straubing. The name Poschinger (often spelled Paskengen, Paschingen, Baskingin or Posching) originated probably from the Posching estate, which was owned by the bishops of Passau.

The genealogical lineage of the family has continued uninterrupted since its inception and began with Joachim Poschinger from Pförring (1523-1599). Joachim Poschinger is considered to be a member of the Posching branch, which originated around 1262. After studying law and music at the University of Ingolstadt, he was a judge and administrator (Pfleger) in the service of the Barons of Degenberg at the castles of Linden near Viechtach and Neunußberg (1550-1568). In 1568, he bought the glassworks estate of Zwieselau (district of Regen) in the Bavarian Forest from the House of Degenberg. This marks the beginning of the Poschinger tradition as owners of glassworks, which continues to this day. Joachim received his imperial coat of arms on October 19, 1547 in Regensburg from Petrus Apianus, imperial count palantine under Emperor Charles V. His son Paulus acquired the glassworks estate of Oberfrauenau in the Bavarian Forest in 1592, from this time on the seat of the progenitor branch.

Due to the possession of Oberanzenberg (since 1639) Wilhelm Poschinger received the noble title Landsass in Upper Palatinate on December 18, 1643 by Prince Elector Maximilian. From this time on, the family was part of the nobility in Upper Palatinate and was listed in the registers of the noble Landsassen.

After Johann Michael I. Poschinger had already acquired the estates of Drachselsried and Wettzell in 1770, his son Georg Benedikt I. submitted a request to the Court Chamber of the Elector in 1784 to elevate the hereditary estate of Frauenau to the status of an independent feudal estate (Hofmark), which was granted on December 7, 1785. Georg Benedikt I. thus had the lower jurisdiction, police authority and certain administrative rights on all three estates.

The family received the hereditary imperial knighthood with the name  Knight and Edler of Poschinger in Oberanzenberg for the following brothers:

 Dr. jur. utr. Johann Martin, Electoral Bavarian Court Advocate and Administrator of the Prince Elector (Pfleger). Later, he was a member of the Electoral Court Chamber Council of Palatinate and Bavaria, Royal Brewery Administrator and Director of the Bavarian Court Brewery Office (1798-1817) in Munich (Progenitor of the discontinued Munich-Mannheim branch)
 Joseph Anton, Tradesman in Passau(Progenitor of the Berg branch, including Poschinger-Camphausen)  
 Georg Benedikt I, Lord of the estates Oberfrauenau, Drachselsried, Wettzell, Neunußberg and Oberanzenberg(Progenitor of the Frauenau branch from which, among other branches, the baronial house originated)  
 Ignaz Dominikus, Priest
The titles were granted on 17 September 1790 in Munich by the acting Imperial Vicar, Elector Charles Theodore of Bavaria. The matriculation in the Kingdom of Bavaria in the knight class took place on 30 January 1810 for Joseph Anton and on 30 June 1810 for his brothers Johann Martin and Georg Benedikt.

In 1873, Georg Benedikt II. Knight of Poschinger, Lord of the Estate of Frauenau (Oberfrauenau) and others, was appointed hereditary Imperial Councillor (Reichsrat) of Bavaria. In accordance with the order of succession, the entail passed on to his brother Eduard Ferdinand after the death of Georg Benedikt. The latter ceded it to his son Eduard Georg Benedikt in 1901, who was appointed as a member of the House of Councillors on 1 November 1901. Eduard Ferdinand Ritter von Poschinger was promoted to hereditary Bavarian Baron on 24 July 1901 in Munich by Prince Regent Luitpold of Bavaria with immatriculation in the Kingdom of Bavaria in the baronial class on 28 August 1901 with the extension of the name to Baron Poschinger of Frauenau.

Estates 
The following estates and residences belong or have belonged to the house of Poschinger since the 16th century

 Oberfrauenau 
 Unter- and Oberzwieselau
 Buchenau
 Oberanzenberg near Kemnath
 Neunußberg
 Wettzell
 Drachselried
 Thalersdorf
 Irlbach
 Steinburg
 Schambach
 Poschinger Palace in Munich
 Riegsee near Murnau (Neuegling Castle)
 Ismaning (Ismaning Palace)
 Zengermoos near Munich
 Karlshof near Munich
 Theresienthal
 Ahausen near Landau a.d.Isar
 Pullach near Bad Aibling
 Rabenstein
 Unterbreitenau near Bischofsmais
 Villa Poschinger in Starnberg

Prominent Members of the Family 

 Benedikt of Poschinger (1785–1856), Bavarian businessman and politician (Member of the State Parliament) 
 Johann Michael II. of Poschinger (1794–1863), Bavarian businessman and politician (Member of the State Parliament) 
 Richard of Poschinger (1839–1915), Bavarian painter 
 Wilhelm of Poschinger (1839–1895),  Bavarian businessman and landowner 
 Ludwig of Poschinger (1844–1917), Bavarian General of Cavalry 
 Georg Benedikt II. of Poschinger (1845–1900), Bavarian businessman and politician (House of Councillors) 
 Heinrich of Poschinger (1845–1911), Author and Historian (Biographer of Bismarck)
 Henriette of Poschinger (1845–1903), Bavarian Glas Designer
 Wilhelm of Poschinger (1864–1921), Bavarian Major General
 Eduard Poschinger of Frauenau (1869–1942), Bavarian military officer, industrialist and politician (House of Councillors) 
 Hans of Poschinger (1892–1951), Bavarian landowner and factory owner, also painter 
 Egon of Poschinger (1894–1977), Bavarian landowner and factory owner, also painter 
 Günther of Poschinger (1898–1958), Entomologist after whom the ground beetle Carabus Poschingerianus was named.
 Hippolyt Poschinger of Frauenau (1908–1990), Bavarian industrialist, forester and politician (President of the Bavarian Senate)
 Adalbert of Poschinger-Bray (1912–2001), German businessman, economist and politician

Sources 
 Genealogisches Handbuch des Adels. Adelige Häuser B. Edition 64, C. A. Starke Verlag, Limburg (Lahn) 1977, .
 Genealogisches Handbuch des Adels. Adelslexikon.Edition 119, C. A. Starke Verlag, Limburg (Lahn) 1999.
 Genealogisches Handbuch des Adels. Freiherrliche Häuser B. Edition 48, C. A. Starke Verlag, Limburg (Lahn) 1971.
 Genealogisches Handbuch des in Bayern immatrikulierten Adels. Band XXX, Wissenschaftlicher Kommissionsverlag Stegaurach, Stegaurach 2014.
 Ernst Heinrich Kneschke: Neues allgemeines deutsches Adels-Lexicon, Edition 7, Leipzig 1867
 Karl Ritter von Poschinger: Geschichte der Poschinger und ihrer Güter. Pullach bei Aibling 1908.
 Karl Ritter von Poschinger: Zusammenstellung der Poschinger vor 1520. Rosenheim 1934.
 Karl und Ludwig Ritter von Poschinger, Hippolyt Freiherr Poschinger von Frauenau, et al.: Verzeichnis der Nachkommen des Joachim Poschinger. 2014.
 Max Peinkofer: 350 Jahre Poschinger in Frauenau. Frauenau 1955.
 August Sieghardt: Die Poschinger in der Oberpfalz. in: Die Oberpfalz. Ediition 43, 1955.
 Ingeborg Seyfert: Die Poschinger von Frauenau als Glashüttenherren im Bayerischen Wald. in: Amtlicher Schulanzeiger für den Regierungsbezirk Niederbayern. Edition 5, 1971.
 Werner Pohl: Die Poschinger im Viechtreich: Als Pfleger von Linden u. als Hofmarksherren von Neunußberg, Wettzell, Drachselried u. Thalersdorf. Viechtach 1976.
 Hermann Wagner: Die Aufschreibungen des Franz Poschinger (1637–1701) vom Glashüttengut Frauenau. Sauerlach 1985.
 Marita Haller: Traumschloss im Wald. Das ehemalige Schloss der Freiherrn Poschinger von Frauenau. edition Lichtland, Freyung 2013.

References

Bavarian noble families